Kim Masters is an entertainment journalist. She is an editor-at-large at The Hollywood Reporter. She is also host of KCRW's weekly radio show "The Business."

Early life 
Masters is an alumna of Bryn Mawr College.

Career 
Masters did not begin as a media reporter, she began her journalism career at Education Daily, a newspaper in the Washington, D.C. area. Masters was a staff reporter for The Washington Post, a correspondent for NPR, and contributing editor for Vanity Fair, Time, and Esquire.

In 1991, Masters left Premiere magazine.

Masters later became an entertainment correspondent for National Public Radio.

In 1993, Masters obtained, for her first assignment by Vanity Fair, the first interview with Lorena Bobbitt.

In 2000, Masters quit Time to work for Steve Brill's Inside magazine (2000-2001).

Between 2006 and 2008, Masters wrote articles for Hollywoodland, a blog for Slate magazine.

In 2016, she was appointed to the Peabody Board of Jurors.

In 2017, Masters' article, on sexual harassment claims against Roy Price head of Amazon Studios, was declined by The Hollywood Reporter, The New York Times, BuzzFeed News, and others, before being published in August by The Information. Later, in October 2017, The Hollywood Reporter published two articles by Masters which covered Price's subsequent suspension from Amazon Studios.

Books
Masters is the author of The Keys to the Kingdom: The Rise of Michael Eisner and the Fall of Everybody Else. Entertainment Weekly gave the book a mixed review, calling it a "lacerating, 450-page takedown," but also writing that it contains "way too much inside baseball to anybody outside the New York-Los Angeles media axis."

Masters and Nancy Griffin co-authored Hit & Run: How Jon Peters and Peter Guber Took Sony for a Ride in Hollywood. Publishers Weekly called the book "a shocking read that will have readers gasping at the obscene overindulgence of Hollywood."

References

Living people
Entertainment journalists
Bryn Mawr College alumni
Year of birth missing (living people)